Melody in the Dark is a 1949 British comedy film, with music. It was co written by John Guillermin. It starred Ben Wrigley and Eunice Gayson.

Premise
When an actress inherits a spooky old house and uses it for rehearsals with her theatre company, they are troubled with "ghosts."

Production
It was an early film credit for John Guillermin.

Wrigley later made High Jinks in Society for the same team.

Cast
Ben Wrigley as Ben
Eunice Gayson as Pat Evans
Dawn Lesley as Dawn
Richard Thorp as Dick
Lionel Newbold as Uncle Egbert
Ida Patlanski as Mrs Grimes
The London Lovelies as Model Girls
Carl Carlisle as Guest Artiste
Maisie Weldon as Guest Artiste
The Stardusters Dance Orchestra as Dance Orchestra
Alan Dean as Lead Singer/Pianist
The Keynotes as Singing Group

Critical reception
Allmovie wrote, "A solid script by John Guillermin bolsters the otherwise so-so British filler Melody in the Dark."

References

External links

British comedy films
1949 films
1949 comedy films
British black-and-white films
1940s British films